Drozdów may refer to the following places:
Drozdów, Łódź Voivodeship (central Poland)
Drozdów, Lubusz Voivodeship (west Poland)
Drozdów, Masovian Voivodeship (east-central Poland)